Florence is a village in Pike County, Illinois, United States. The population was 17 at the 2020 census, making Florence the second-least populated municipality in Illinois.

Geography
Florence is located at  (39.628248, −90.610328).

Demographics

As of the census of 2000, there were 71 people, 30 households, and 21 families residing in the village. The racial makeup of the village was 100.00% White.

There were 30 households, out of which 16.7% had children under the age of 18 living with them, 50.0% were married couples living together, 16.7% had a female householder with no husband present, and 30.0% were non-families. 23.3% of all households were made up of individuals, and 13.3% had someone living alone who was 65 years of age or older. The average household size was 2.37 and the average family size was 2.67.

In the village, the population was spread out, with 22.5% under the age of 18, 5.6% from 18 to 24, 22.5% from 25 to 44, 26.8% from 45 to 64, and 22.5% who were 65 years of age or older. The median age was 44 years. For every 100 females, there were 115.2 males. For every 100 females age 18 and over, there were 89.7 males.

The median income for a household in the village was $20,000, and the median income for a family was $22,679. Males had a median income of $19,000 versus $20,625 for females. The per capita income for the village was $9,878. There were 8.0% of families and 15.1% of the population living below the poverty line, including no under eighteens and 5.0% of those over 64.

References

Villages in Pike County, Illinois
Villages in Illinois